Bruno Platter was the 65th Grand Master of the Teutonic Order. He served three terms and retired in 2018 at the age of 74.

Platter was born in South Tyrol, Italy.

References 

1944 births
Living people
People from Ritten
Grand Masters of the Teutonic Order
Germanophone Italian people